Caitlin Rother (born December 6, 1962) is a New York Times bestselling non-fiction, true crime American-Canadian author and journalist who lives in San Diego, California.

Biography and education
As a toddler, she moved with her family from Quebec, Canada to California. She attended La Jolla High School. In 1984, she graduated with a bachelor's degree in psychology from the University of California, Berkeley. In 1987, she graduated with a master's degree from the Medill School of Journalism at Northwestern University.

Career
In the late 1980s, she wrote for the Berkshire Eagle and the Springfield Union-News in Massachusetts. She returned to California and went to work as a reporter for the Los Angeles Daily News after working a year as a freelancer for the Los Angeles Times. Beginning in 1993, she worked as a metro news and investigative reporter for The San Diego Union-Tribune. She left the paper in 2006 to write full-time as an author.

In 2005 she published Poisoned Love, a book about Kristin Rossum's murder of her husband, Greg de Villers. The publication was updated in 2011.

Rother co-authored the memoir of Scott Bolzan, a former NFL player, titled My Life, Deleted about how Bolzan rebuilt his life after suffering permanent retrograde amnesia. The book was released by HarperCollins in October 2011. It made the New York Times bestseller list for two weeks on October 23, 2011 at #16 for ebooks non-fiction and #29 for combined hardcover and ebooks non-fiction, and on October 30 at #29 for combined hardcover and ebooks non-fiction.

In July 2012, Rother wrote the book Lost Girls about convicted killer and sexual predator John Albert Gardner and his motivation for murdering San Diego-area teenagers Chelsea King and Amber Dubois. It was released by Kensington Books.

Rother’s book, Death on Ocean Boulevard: Inside the Coronado Mansion Case, about the mysterious 2011 death of Rebecca Zahau, was published in April 2021 by Kensington Books under their Citadel Press label. 

In November 2021, the film/tv rights to Death on Ocean Boulevard were acquired by Untitled Entertainment and they began early production on a limited series based on the book. Rother serves as an Executive Producer on the project. 

Rother teaches creative non-fiction and creative writing part-time at the University of California, San Diego's extension program.

Appearances
She has appeared on national television and radio shows, including Nancy Grace,  Investigation Discovery channel, Oxygen network's Snapped, On the Record with Greta Van Susteren, and the "Jay Thomas Show" and "America at Night" radio programs.

Books

Non-fiction
Death On Ocean Boulevard: Inside the Coronado Mansion Case (April 2021)
I'll Take Care of You (January 2014)
Lost Girls (July 2012)
My Life Deleted (Oct 2011)
Deadly Devotion/Where Hope Begins (July 2011)
Dead Reckoning (Feb 2011)
Twisted Triangle (April 2009)
Body Parts (March 2009)
Poisoned Love (July 2005)
Then No One Can Have Her (October 2015)

Fiction
Naked Addiction (Nov 2007)

References

External links 
 Author's official site
 

Living people
Canadian emigrants to the United States
American women journalists
Medill School of Journalism alumni
University of California, Berkeley alumni
Writers from Montreal
Writers from California
20th-century Canadian women writers
20th-century Canadian writers
21st-century Canadian women writers
Los Angeles Times people
20th-century American biographers
American women biographers
21st-century American biographers
1962 births
20th-century American women
21st-century American women